Wyoming is a city in Jones County, Iowa, United States. The population was 523 at the time of the 2020 census. It is part of the Cedar Rapids Metropolitan Statistical Area.

History
Wyoming was incorporated on October 21, 1873, and was named for Wyoming County, New York.

Geography
Wyoming is located at  (42.059187, -91.004985).

Demographics

2010 census
At the 2010 census there were 515 people, 243 households, and 136 families living in the city. The racial makup of the city was 99.0% White, 0.6% Native American, and 0.4% from two or more races. Hispanic or Latino of any race were 1.2%.

Of the 243 households 25.5% had children under the age of 18 living with them, 44.4% were married couples living together, 7.0% had a female householder with no husband present, 4.5% had a male householder with no wife present, and 44.0% were non-families. 38.3% of households were one person and 20.1% were one person aged 65 or older. The average household size was 2.12 and the average family size was 2.80.

The median age was 44.9 years. 21.6% of residents were under the age of 18; 5.4% were between the ages of 18 and 24; 23% were from 25 to 44; 29.5% were from 45 to 64; and 20.4% were 65 or older. The gender makeup of the city was 50.5% male and 49.5% female.

2000 census
At the 2000 census there were 626 people, 277 households, and 173 families living in the city. The racial makup of the city was 98.56% White, 0.64% African American, 0.32% Native American, and 0.48% from two or more races. Hispanic or Latino of any race were 0.16%.

Of the 277 households 29.2% had children under the age of 18 living with them, 50.5% were married couples living together, 9.7% had a female householder with no husband present, and 37.5% were non-families. 35.4% of households were one person and 21.7% were one person aged 65 or older. The average household size was 2.26 and the average family size was 2.91.

The age distribution was 26.4% under the age of 18, 6.4% from 18 to 24, 26.5% from 25 to 44, 19.3% from 45 to 64, and 21.4% 65 or older. The median age was 39 years. For every 100 females, there were 86.3 males. For every 100 females age 18 and over, there were 82.9 males.

The median household income was $31,979 and the median family income  was $41,538. Males had a median income of $30,938 versus $23,611 for females. The per capita income for the city was $15,787. About 10.6% of families and 12.2% of the population were below the poverty line, including 18.8% of those under age 18 and 9.7% of those age 65 or over.

Education
It is within the Midland Community School District and is the location of the school district's only secondary school.

Notable people

Daniel Mary Gorman (1861–1927), clergyman of the Roman Catholic Church; born in Wyoming
Dutch Levsen (1898–1972), Former pitcher for the Cleveland Indians; born in Wyoming
Orson Lowell (1871–1956), magazine illustrator, born in Wyoming

References

External links
Wyoming, Iowa Website
City-Data.com

Cities in Jones County, Iowa
Cities in Iowa
Cedar Rapids, Iowa metropolitan area